The ceremonial county of Hertfordshire has returned 11 MPs to the UK Parliament since 1997.

Hertfordshire has been represented in Parliament since 1290. The number of MPs and the parts represented have changed considerably over time. In 1885 there were just four seats and this has increased by one at each major redistribution which came into effect for the general elections of 1918, 1945, 1950, 1955, February 1974, 1983 and 1997. The latest recommendations made by the Boundary Commission for England, coming into effect for the 2010 general election resulted in only minor alterations.

As a result of the creation of Greater London under the London Government Act 1963, which came into effect on 1 April 1965, the boundaries of the historic/administrative county were altered, with Barnet being created as a Metropolitan Borough within Greater London and the more rural area of Potters Bar being transferred from the abolished county of Middlesex. This was reflected in the following redistribution of parliamentary seats which came into effect for the February 1974 general election and effectively reduced the county's representation by 1 MP.

Number of seats 
The table below shows the number of MPs representing Hertfordshire at each major redistribution of seats affecting the county.

1Prior to 1950, seats were classified as County Divisions or Parliamentary Boroughs. Since 1950, they have been classified as County or Borough Constituencies.

2Borough of St Albans (2 seats) disenfranchised for corruption.

Timeline

Boundary reviews

See also 

 List of parliamentary constituencies in Hertfordshire

References 

Hertfordshire
Parliamentary constituencies in Hertfordshire (historic)